The 2015 Horizon League men's basketball tournament began on March 3, 2015, with the championship game on Tuesday, March 10. First round games were played on the home court of the higher-seeded team. The second round and semifinals were hosted by Valparaiso, because the Crusaders won the regular season conference championship. Since Valparaiso won its semifinal game, it also hosted the championship game. Only eight of the nine teams in the conference played in the Horizon League Tournament, as Milwaukee has been deemed ineligible for postseason play for the 2014–15 season.

Teams were seeded by 2014–15 Horizon League season record, with a tiebreaker system to seed teams with identical conference records. The top two teams received a bye to the semifinals and the third and fourth seeds received byes to the quarterfinals.

Tie breaking system
The tiebreaking system is as follows:
 Two teams
 Head to head conference record.
 Record against the team occupying the highest position in the standings. Continue down through the standings until the tie is broken.
 Higher RPI based on Collegiate Basketball News.

 Three or more teams
 Combined record of each of the tied teams against the other teams involved in the tie until the tie is broken.
 Record against the team occupying the highest position in the standings. Continue down through the standings until the tie is reduced to a two-team tie. Use the two team system.
 Higher RPI based on Collegiate Basketball News.

Seeds

Schedule

Bracket

First round games at campus sites of higher seeds.
Second round and semifinals hosted by No. 1 seed.
Championship game hosted by highest remaining seed.

References

Tournament
Horizon League men's basketball tournament
Horizon League men's basketball tournament
Horizon League men's basketball tournament